Carolina Araujo (born 11 June 1971) is a Mozambican former backstroke and freestyle swimmer. She competed in three events at the 1988 Summer Olympics.

References

External links
 

1971 births
Living people
Mozambican female backstroke swimmers
Mozambican female freestyle swimmers
Olympic swimmers of Mozambique
Swimmers at the 1988 Summer Olympics
Place of birth missing (living people)